Hermann Saue (born 3 April 1939) is a Norwegian politician for the Conservative Party.

He served as a deputy representative to the Parliament of Norway from Hordaland during the terms 1977–1981, 1981–1985 and 1985–1989. In total he met during 1 day of parliamentary session.

References

1939 births
Living people
Conservative Party (Norway) politicians
Deputy members of the Storting
Hordaland politicians
Place of birth missing (living people)
20th-century Norwegian politicians